Richard Seaford is a British classicist. He is professor emeritus of classics and ancient history at the University of Exeter. His work focuses on ancient Greek culture, especially that of ancient Athens.

Career
Seaford has published widely on Greek literature and religion, from Homer to the New Testament, and especially on the god Dionysos. His book Money and the Early Greek Mind. Homer, Tragedy, Philosophy (2004) explores the role of money on ancient Greek culture, which he argues was the first culture to become pervasively monetised. He argues that the introduction of coinage, which occurred around the end of the 7th century BCE, provided a crucial stimulus for the advent of Greek philosophy, in which a universal substance is (like money) transformed from and into everything else.

In 2005–2008 he was awarded a Leverhulme Major Research Fellowship for a study of Aeschylus. For 2013-4 he was awarded an AHRC Fellowship for a comparative historical study of early Indian with early Greek thought.

Political views
Seaford accepted the Palestinian request to support the international academic boycott of Israel and has declined an invitation to review a book for the Israeli journal Scripta Classica Israelica. In a report carried by the European Jewish Press he cited "the brutal and illegal expansionism and the slow-motion ethnic cleansing" by the state of Israel. The report quoted him further: "I am aware of the honest arguments for and against a boycott, and that even some Israeli academics support the boycott and many do not. Whatever your views, I hope you will understand that my view is based on a widely shared moral outrage."

Selected publications
 Pompeii (Summerfield Press ; New York : distributed by Thames & Hudson, 1978) 
 Euripides Cyclops with Introduction and Commentary (Oxford [Oxfordshire] : Clarendon Press ; New York : Oxford University Press, 1984) 
 Reciprocity and Ritual: Homer and Tragedy in the Developing City-state (Oxford [England] : Clarendon Press ; New York : Oxford University Press, 1994) 
 Euripides Bacchae (Aris and Phillips, 1996)
 Reciprocity in Ancient Greece (co-editor with C. Gill and N. Postlethwaite) (Oxford ; New York : Oxford University Press, 1998) 
 Money and the early Greek Mind: Homer, Tragedy, and Philosophy (Cambridge, UK ; New York : Cambridge University Press, 2004) 
 Dionysos (London ; New York : Routledge, 2006) 
 Cosmology and the Polis: the Social Construction of Space and Time in the Tragedies of Aeschylus (Cambridge, UK ; New York : Cambridge University Press, 2012) 
 Tragedy, Ritual and Money in Ancient Greece. Selected Essays (Cambridge University Press, 2018) 
 The Origins of Philosophy in Ancient Greece and Ancient India. A Historical Comparison (Cambridge University Press, 2019) -2

References

External links 
 Professor Richard Seaford's homepage at the University of Exeter

Year of birth missing (living people)
Living people
Classical scholars of the University of Exeter
British classical scholars
Scholars of ancient Greek literature
Labour Party (UK) people
Academics of the University of Exeter
Presidents of the Classical Association